Metz Cathedral, otherwise the Cathedral of Saint Stephen, Metz, is a Roman Catholic cathedral in Metz, capital of Lorraine, France. It is dedicated to Saint Stephen. First begun in the early 14th century, it was joined with the collegiate church of Notre-Dame in the mid-14th century, and given a new transept and late Gothic chevet, finished between 1486 and 1520. It is the cathedral of the Roman Catholic Diocese of Metz as the seat of the bishops of Metz. The cathedral treasury displays the collection, assembled over 1,000 years, of the bishopric of Metz, including paraments and items used for the Eucharist.

Metz Cathedral has the third-highest nave of cathedrals in France (41.41 meters (135.9 ft)), behind Amiens Cathedral and Beauvais Cathedral. The stained glass windows include works by Gothic and Renaissance master glass makers Hermann von Münster, Theobald of Lixheim, and Valentin Bousch. Later artistic styles are represented by Charles-Laurent Maréchal (Romanticism), Roger Bissière (tachisme), Jacques Villon (Cubism), and Marc Chagall (modernism).

History

Early churches 
A Gallo-Roman oppidum, or fortified town, called Diuodron Medimatriques, occupied the site from at least the first century B.C. It became a stop on the trade route between Lyon and Treves, and was an imperial residence during the Roman Empire between 306 and 390. The presence of the first bishop, Clement, is recorded in 346.

The cathedral was built on an ancient site from the 5th century dedicated to Saint Stephen. It is said to have contained a collection of his relics. According to Gregory of Tours, the shrine of Saint Stephen was the sole structure spared during the sack of 451 by Attila's Huns. It was a royal residence of the grandsons of Clovis, king of the Franks, and of Theudebert I, who became the Merovingian ruler in 534.

Gregory of Tours mentioned the existence of the church in 584, and a cathedral under the archbishop Arnoul is mentioned in 616.  The Archbishop and Saint Chrodegang (742-766) is mentioned in accounts of the time as a papal envoy to the Franks. He is credited with introducing the Roman liturgy and chants, with the support of King of the Franks, Pepin, between 751 and 768. Chrodegang is also credited with establishing the first cathedral chapter in western Europe, and also the first cathedral close, combining chapels, dormitory, refectory, and other functional buildings. This system was formally adopted by other Frankish cathedrals under the Capitulary of Aix-en-Chapelle in 816. This first cloister, on the south side of the cathedral where the Place des Armes is located, was in existence in 1754, when it was demolished in response to new papal doctrines.

The Ottonian or Pre-Romanesque cathedral 

In 843, after long disputes between the successors to Charlemagne, the Holy Roman Empire was broken into four parts. In 870, Metz and its province Lorraine allied with East Francia  while remaining an autonomous duchy. In 962, when Otto I, Holy Roman Emperor, restored the Empire, Lorraine was designated as the autonomous Duchy of Lorraine, with Metz as its capital. It maintained this status until 1766, when it formally became part of France.

The construction of a new cathedral began under bishop Thierry I between 965 and 984, and was completed under his second successor Thierry II of Luxembourg, between 1006 and 1047. It was built in what was later called Ottonian architecture, a form of pre-Romanesque architecture. This church had two towers and three bays on the west front, a nave with three vessels, and a larger tower over the transept. Because of its placement on a terrace next to the Moselle River, the cathedral could not have the traditional east to west orientation from the choir to the west front. Instead, it was oriented on an axis from southeast to northwest. The roof, following a regional tradition, was covered with tiles of white limestone.

A smaller church, the Collegiale of Notre-Dame-la-Ronde, was built close to the old cathedral in the 8th century, and was entirely rebuilt between 1200 and 1207 to be oriented directly with the axis of the cathedral. The complex of early buildings also included the cloister and a palace for the archbishop, where the market square is located today.

The Gothic Cathedral 

The reconstruction of the cathedral in the Gothic style was proposed in about 1220 by the bishop of Metz, Conrad III of Scharfenberg, the chancellor of Frederick II, Holy Roman Emperor.  The work began under James of Lotharingia, the head of the chapter, who became bishop in 1239. Construction began at the west end of the nave and continued to the transept and the old choir, which was still in place until the end of the 15th century. The vault of the new structure was not planned to be higher than 30–35 meters.

The plan integrated the neighbouring Collegiate church of Our Lady into the western end of the cathedral, which resulted in the absence of a traditional west-end portal. The south-western porch of the cathedral became the entrance of the former collegiate church.

The nave, with the exception of its vaults, was probably finished between 1245 and 1250. Then a decision was taken to make the cathedral much taller, with the addition of a new level of large windows about forty meters high, equal in height to the two levels below. New more massive columns were added, and the triforium between the arcades and high windows was enlarged and strengthened to support the greater weight. Between 1250 and 1255 the south side walls west of the transept were also strengthened to support the new higher walls. The south façade was also built higher to match the greater height of the new nave. The piers of the flying buttresses were also reconstructed, doubling their height. In about 1270–75, the tower of the Chapter was raised to the height of the cornice of the new nave.

Since the new nave was now twice as high as planned, the towers also had to be made taller. Between 1275 and 1280, A second level and the beginning of a third level were added to the Tour de la Mutte. By 1359 the nave was entirely covered, but work on the upper walls continued for another twenty years. In 1380–81, the canons of the cathedral decided to demolish the wall which separated the cathedral from the adjoining nave of the church of Our Lady. This was resisted by the clergy of the collegiate church, but the work went ahead, modified by the installation of a grill between the two naves. In 1381 the cathedral chapter engaged the glassmaker Herman of Münster to make a rose window for the west front, which was finished in 1392. 

There was a lull of nearly a century before major work was resumed on the construction of the transept and the choir. In 1388 a wooden belfry was installed by the city government on the La Mutte tower, and a new chapel, the Bishop's Chapel, was added on the lower south aisle in 1443. Its patron, Bishop Conrad Bayer of Boppard, died a few days after the chapel was consecrated, and was interred within it in 1459. 

In 1468 a serious fire broke out on the new balustrade of the roof. In the years before the fire, from 1452 to 1467, there had been a bitter dispute between the city leaders and the cathedral authorities over who was responsible for the maintenance and safety of cathedral property, which Bishop George of Baden ended by excommunicating the city leaders.  When the fire broke out, the city leaders refused to assist the clergy in fighting the fire, only sending men to put out the fire on the bell tower, which was owned by the city. Relations thereafter between the city and clerical authorities were strained. 

The last work on the La Mutte bell tower was completed between 1477 and 1483. The stone shaft forty meters high was topped by a tall spire, giving it a total height of almost ninety meters. The finished cathedral was consecrated on 11 April 1552.

Gothic Completion and neoclassical additions (16th–18th century)  

Work continued into the 16th century to rebuild the remaining Romanesque portions into the Gothic style. The old choir was demolished in 1503. A few weeks later, the old Romanesque south transept fell. The next year work began on the new transept, and the final flying buttress of the choir was installed ion 1506.  The new construction largely followed the original Gothic style. 
A new canonical choir was built beginning in 1519 next to the sanctuary, at the crossing of the transept. An ornate rood screen was installed between the choir and the nave, with sculpture by Mansuy Gauvain, and new choir stalls were installed. The choir was completed with a new altar and a small organ in the triforium above the rood screen. A project was also begun to create a new grand portal on the west end. The work was begun but was halted in 1552 by the entry into the city of the army of King Henry II of France. Work did not resume until 1761.

Metz and the Duchy of Lorraine formally retained their independent status, but the French political and cultural influence grew from 1737 until 1766, when France formally annexed the Duchy. In 1741, proponents of the new French classical style, popular in Paris, proposed to redecorate the choir of Metz Cathedral in the new style. They presented a neoclassical program for the choir by the royal sculptor from Paris, Sébastien Slodtz. However, Slotdtz's proposed decoration was fiercely resisted by the more conservative chapter and was finally rejected in 1762.

In 1754 another large modification was begun by the governor of Metz. He destroyed the old cloisters next to the church, with their chapels and arcades, with the intention of creating a parade ground for official celebrations. However, this project was abandoned in 1758. Instead, the space was filled by a group of houses, shops and a large pavilion.

Another classical addition to the cathedral was proposed in 1755 by the royal architect Jacques-François Blondel. He was commissioned by the Royal Academy of Architecture to build a Neoclassical Doric portico which would serve as the main entrance to the cathedral. This was funded partially by Louis XV, to celebrate his recovery from a serious illness from which he had nearly died in Metz in 1744. It was duly built between 1764 and 1766, However, the work on this new portal caused more problems;  it was found that the portico would block some of the stained glass windows, and the digging of the deep foundations for the portico  immediately created weaknesses in the west front and north buttress.

The Revolution to the 21st century 

In the years before the French Revolution in 1789, many of the Gothic tombs and monuments of the cathedral were removed, or put into lower aisles to accommodate the new classical taste.  The Revolution greatly accelerated the destruction. The cathedral chapter was formally abolished in 1790, and the cathedral was declared a simple parish and episcopal church. The old rood screen, made in 1555. was destroyed and replaced by a circular platform or stage in the transept. From 1793 to 1794, the cathedral was officially termed a "Temple of Reason". It was turned into a legal church in 1795, and services resumed, but it was not formally returned to the Catholic Church until 1802.

The cathedral was in a deplorable state in the early 19th century. The vaults shook when the bells in the tower rang. The arch supporting the right side of the bell tower was broken, and the windows of the tower had to be removed. The arch was finally replaced in 1829. Weaknesses of the foundation made the new portico unsteady. The wood of the belfry of the Chapter tower was rotting, and falling in pieces onto the street below; workmen refused to enter the unstable tower.  The government finally agreed to finance the complete reconstruction of the tower of La Mutte, which was completed in 1843. The government of Emperor Louis-Napoleon promised a full restoration of the cathedral.

Following the Prussian victory in the Franco-Prussian War of 1870, Lorraine and Metz were taken from France in 1871 and annexed to the new German Empire. In 1877, the cathedral was heavily damaged by a major fire caused by fireworks. The King of Prussia and Emperor William I took a particular interest in the rebuilding of Metz Cathedral, to win the support of the population.

A young architect from Munich, Paul Tornow, became master of works of the cathedral in 1874  and held the position for thirty-two years, until 1906. He first constructed a new roof, built on a metal frame, which raised its height by 3.5 meters. He then removed the collection of structures that had been built up against the walls, and restored the Chapel of Notre-Dame-de-Mont-Carmel, which had previously belonged to the adjoining church of Notre-Dame-la-Rond. He reopened the windows which had been blocked by the 19th-century construction. He also cleared out the crypt of the cathedral, which had been turned into a storeroom for the neighbouring shops in the gallery. Between 1874 and 1877 he restored the vaults and buttresses that had been weakened by age and the fire.  Between 1898 and 1903 he removed Blondel's classical portico over the portal.

The new portal was the subject of careful study by Tornow. He decided upon a 14th-century Gothic style, in harmony with the rose window.  With the French sculptor Auguste Dujardin, he visited twenty-one cathedrals in Burgundy, the Ile-de-France, Normandy and Champagne, taking photographs to act as the basis for his design.  The final plan adapted elements of the 13th and 14th centuries, and borrowed particularly from the portals of Auxerre Cathedral, Chartres Cathedral and Amiens Cathedral. He also rebuilt triangular gables at the top of the north and south facades in the late Gothic style, with spires and pinnacles. The new south portal was completed and inaugurated on 14 May 1903. The final project of the exterior renovation was the La Mutte tower, which was granted back to the church by the city, which had taken it as the municipal bell tower.

Major restoration and rebuilding also took place inside the cathedral, under another architect, Wilhelm Schmitz. He enlarged the choir, restored damaged windows, constructed new choir stalls, and installed a new stone choir screen, new altars, and new bronze doors for the west portal.  In 1914 war interrupted the work. In 1918, at the end of the First World War, Lorraine and the cathedral were returned to France. The forty-four new choir stalls, made in Colmar in 1914, were finally installed 1922.

Between the First and Second World Wars, little funding was available to restore or improve the cathedral; the only significant addition was a new bishop's chair, installed in 1932. However, after the Second World War, chief architect Robert Renaud began a campaign to restore and renew the art. He had a copy made and installed of the angel-musician statue which had decorated the roof–it had been blown down in a storm in 1952. In 1965, a stained glass window of David and Bathsheba, designed by Marc Chagall was installed in Bay 9, along with windows by other contemporary artists.

Until 1960 all the furnishings of the cathedral were either original Gothic or recreations of Gothic. That year the cathedral began to acquire modern works of furniture and art, including windows designed by Marc Chagall, Jacques Villon and other artists.

In 1999 another wind storm broke loose a pinnacle from the roof, which fell through the roof of the sacristy, requiring major work.  The west rose window also showed signs of weakness, due to the absence of a supporting buttress on the west, and began to crack.  It was reinforced with two steel supports between 1995 and 2000.  The La Mutte tower was restored beginning in 2009, including the restoration of the bells and their mechanism.

Timeline of construction
 984 – c. 1040 Construction of an Ottonian basilica over an ancient shrine dedicated to Saint Stephen
 c. 1180 – 1207 Construction of a chapel in Early Gothic style on the west side of the basilica
 1220 Beginning of the construction of the Gothic cathedral within the foundations of the Ottonian basilica, construction of the aisles
 1265–1285 Construction of the triforia and the two bell towers
 1285 – c. 1290 Elevation of the westwork within the foundations of a Gothic chapel from the 12th century
 1290s Construction of the vaults of the nave and the supporting flying buttresses
 c. 1300–1330s Construction of the Lady Chapel
 1380 Junction between the former Gothic chapel and the nave
 1384 Creation of the stained glass tympanum of the west facade and the rose window by master glass maker Hermann von Münster
 1478–1483 Elevation of the spire
 1486–1490s Construction of the northern transept
 1504 Creation of the stained glass tympanum of the northern transept by master glass maker Theobald of Lixheim
 c. 1490–1500s Construction of the Gothic choir and east end
 1504–1520s Construction of the southern transept
 1518–1539 Stained glass by master glass maker Valentin Bousch, including the tympanum on the southern transept
 1761–1764 Neoclassical refurbishment conducted by Jacques-François Blondel
 c.1850–1880s Destruction of the ornaments of Jacques-François Blondel
 1889–1903 Construction of a Neogothic portal on the west front
 1965–1967 Stained glass windows of Marc Chagall

Exterior
Metz Cathedral is a Rayonnant Gothic edifice built of the local yellow Jaumont limestone. As in French Gothic architecture, the building is compact, with slight projection of the transepts and subsidiary chapels. However, it displays singular, distinctive characteristics in both its ground plan and architecture compared to most other cathedrals. Because of the topography of the Moselle valley in Metz, the common west–east axis of the ground plan could not be applied and the church is oriented north-northeast. Moreover, unlike the French and German Gothic cathedrals having three portals surmounted by a rose window and two large towers, this one has a single porch at its western front. The entrance is to the side of the building through another portal placed at the south-western side of the narthex, avoiding the usual alignment of the entrance with the choir.

This feature permitted the architects to create large, tall expanses of stained glass. Throughout its history the cathedral has been subjected to architectural and ornamental modifications with successive additions of Neoclassical and Neogothic elements.

West Front and the Portal of Christ 

The portal of the west front, typically the main entrance of a cathedral, in Metz is a secondary entrance. The original Gothic portal  was replaced by a classical entrance in 1724, which was replaced by the current Neo-Gothic portal in 1903, called "Christ the King." It was designed by architect Paul Tornow and artist Auguste Dujardin. It is lavishly filled with sculpture including column-statues in niches above smaller sculptures in the soubassement. The tympanum over the portal, largely inspired by the Tympanum of Amiens Cathedral, illustrates the Last Judgement, with Christ as the central figure, between two figures representing the Church the Synagogue. The portal is flanked by four 4-meter-tall statues of the prophets Isaiah, Jeremiah, Ezekiel and Daniel. The statue of Daniel was originally given the features of the German Emperor of the time, William II, who commissioned the Portal before the First World War. The moustaches were removed during the German occupation of Metz in World War II.

Portal of the Virgin 

The Portal of the Virgin, in the south side facing the Place d'Armes, was constructed before 1225.  It was the main entrance of the cathedral until the 18th century, and it most probably occupied the same place as the entrance of the earlier pre-Romanesque cathedral. It was covered over and seriously degraded during the addition of classical features in the 18th century, and was not uncovered until 1867. It was then lowered by a meter and a half. A majority of the sculpture, was recreated by Auguste Dujardin, and other portions were restored. It was not formally opened until 1885. The sculpture depicts scenes from the life of the Virgin Mary, culminating at the top of the arch with the crowning of the Virgin by Christ. Recent research found traces of orange, red and green pigment, indicating that the original portal sculpture was brightly colored.

Portal of Notre-Dame-La-Ronde 

The Portal of Notre-Dame-La-Ronde, on the northwest side, dates to 1260–65 and is the oldest and most simply decorated entry to the cathedral. In the 18th century, it was given a classical canopy to harmonise with the other classical features, but it still retains panels of the 13th-century sculpture and carved stonework resembling fabric around the doorway. Similar design from the same period is found at Reims Cathedral.

Bell Tower of La Mutte, Chapter Tower and Horloge Tower 

The south tower of the cathedral, called "La Mutte", was both the cathedral and municipal bell tower; it was built in 1324 and the municipal bell, called La Mutte, was installed there in 1381. This bell was rung in case of fires, approaching enemies or important civic events. After a fire in 1468, a new upper stage of the tower and a spire was constructed on top, bringing the height to ninety meters. It has two platforms where watchmen were posted to look out for fires or approaching enemies.

The present major city bell in the tower is named "La Mutte" and was cast in 1605. It weighs 11,000 kilograms (24,250 pounds). A second bell, called Tocsin, made in 1501, weighs 1500 kilos, and is rung to signal the end of the day; along with a third small bell, called Mademoiselle de Tourmel, made in 1802 and recast in 1875.  It weighs just 45 kilograms.

The Chapter Tower (Tour de Chapitre), was built at the same time, at the end of the 14th and beginning of the 15th century, and in the same style and plan as the tower of La Mutte. This tower also contains a portal to the cathedral, the Portal of St. Stephen. The medieval sculpture was nearly all destroyed by the end of the 18th century, with the exception of a scene on the lintel of the stoning of Saint Stephen, and two scenes from the life of St. Clement.

The west front of the cathedral receives support from a massive buttress on the north, while on the south the facade gets support from the Tower of the Horloge, an eight-sided tower, more slender and shorter than the tower of La Mutte, whose lower portion, with sections of white stone, probably belonged to the original collegiate built in 1207. It is capped by an octagonal belfry and an open pyramid, which were added in 1896. The exterior of this tower features an angel holding a sundial, decorated with the coat of arms of the city, and the date 1504. This tower formally belonged to the city of Metz, and contains a second set of cathedral bells. The largest bell, which sounds the hours, was made in 1413, and weighs 2000 kilograms; a smaller bell sounds the quarter hours, and was made 1398 (60 kilograms); and there is a third bell from the 16th century (also weighing 60 kilograms).

Transept 

The transept and the chevet at the northeast end of the cathedral were constructed together between 1487 and 1450. In this part of the cathedral, the vaults reach a height of 45 meters. The triangular north transept gable was a later addition of Neo-Gothic, made in 1886 in the 15th-century style. It is crowned with a statue of the Virgin Mary, marking the chapel of the Virgin. The south transept facade has a matching gable made in 1883–85, in the more ornate flamboyant style. It is crowned by two statues, Saint Nicholas and a local medieval bishop, Saint Goëry. There is also a flamboyant gable over the large south window, also an elaborate flamboyant style, with curves and counter-curves. It was damaged by the 19th-century fire and was replaced. At the top is a statue of Saint Stephen, the patron saint of the cathedral.

The chevet 

The chevet, at the southeast end of the cathedral, was built between 1503 and 1508 atop the earlier Romanesque crypt and the earlierRayonnant style chapels. It contains the apse and disambulatory, and three radiating chapels; the axis chapel of the Virgin; and chapels of the Sacred Heart and Notre-Dame of Mount-Carmel. The doorway to Rue du Vivier was added in 1889.

The chapels are separated by the massive buttresses and arches which support the upper walls. The buttresses themselves are decorated with spires, which give them extra weight.  The windows of the upper walls are topped with pointed arches and pinnacles, and the chevet is flanked by two additional slender towers with spires on either side of the choir, which give additional support to the structure. On the north is the Tower of the Boule d'Or or Tower of the Pomme d'Or (Named for a gilded copper apple ornament on top of the spire before the Revolution); and to south, the Tower of Charlemagne. This tower has a stairway that gives access to the terraces, triforium, and the narrow pathway around the edge of the roof of the choir.

The Interior

The nave

The nave is the portion of a cathedral, usually at the west end, where the worshippers are seated. The nave of Metz Cathedral is noted for its exceptional height, harmony, and especially the great quantity of stained glass that entirely fills the upper walls, the largest area of glass of any cathedral. It has the traditional elevation of Gothic cathedrals of the 13th century, with three levels; an arcade of pointed arches supported by large pillars on the ground floor, 12.65 meters high; above that a triforium with windows. six meters high; above that a decorative band of two friezes with sculpted foliage and drapery; and above that the high windows extending upwards 25.5 meters into the vaults. Slender colonettes run up the walls between the windows from the arcade pillars to support the vaults. The pillars of the arcade, consisting of bundled columns, also have decoration; sculpted grapevines and other vegetal designs, from about 1245. 

The four-part rib vaults of the nave vaults are exceptionally high; between 41.2 and 42.6 meters, exceeded in height only by those of Beauvais Cathedral (48 meters), matching those of Amiens Cathedral (42.3. meters), and taller than those of Reims Cathedral (38 meters).   The collateral aisles on either side of the nave are not nearly as high; just 13.3 meters, but they also have walls largely filled with stained glass.

Transept and choir 

The Transept and choir were built later than the nave, between 1487 and 1520, with elaborate decoration in the flamboyant style of the late Gothic in the tracery of the windows and the pillars.  Nonetheless, the builders respected the elevations and distribution of space on the walls established in the nave at the end of the 13th century.  The high windows of the nave were the model for the high windows in the transept and the choir.

Parts of the north transept also serve an important structural purpose; the section of the transept where it meets the nave, made about 1300, also serves a buttress for the arches of the nave where they meet the transept.  Each level of the transept also has narrow coursières, or passageways, built in the wall on the interior and exterior of the transept.

The vaults of the transept meet the vaults of the nave and choir at the central crossing. The transept is 46.80 metres (153.5 ft) high and 16.34 metres (53.6 ft) wide. The vault in the center of the crossing has additional decorative lierne and tiercon ribs, which form a star, and a large keystone, 1.7 meters high and 3.7 meters across, at the meeting point.  
 
The choir of a cathedral, where the clergy traditionally worships,  is usually long, but because of the unusual topography under the cathedral, the choir in Metz is relatively short, and raised up by twelve steps from the transept.

The modern liturgical furniture in the choir was created by the Swiss-born French artist Mattia Bonetti between 2004 and 2006. It includes an altar, Ambon or tribune, and cathedre, or bishop's chair.  They are made of bronze, marble and oak, with a motif of reeds gently blowing in the wind, against a dark background.

The Altar of Notre Dame de Lourdes  made of red marble in 1911 by the Munich sculptor Max Heilmaler, It was subject to many later alterations. It depicts the Virgin in a red marble mandorle. The additional sculpture of the Announciation, also by Heilmaler.  Below the altar a depiction of Christ being presented at the Temple, by Caspar Weis.

With it is the retable made of gilded and painted oak, It was originally made for the altar of a chapel at the shrine of Notre Dame de Lourdes, where it was placed in 1245. It depicts the Virgin, with the moon at her feet, with figures of Saint Barbara and Saint Catherine.  It was removed from that church in 1912 because the church authorities in Lourdes felt it clashed with the simplicity of the decor there.

The choir stalls are a prominent feature in the centre of the Choir. They were made by Théophile Klem of Colmar between 1913 and 1914, but they were not put into place until 1922–23. Carvings also decorate They decorate the screen of the choir made in 1912.

The apse, diambulatory and radiating chapels 

Beyond the choir is the apse, with a semicircular passage, the disambulatory, which leads to the three chapels at the end of the cathedral. The central chapel is dedicated to the Virgin Mary, the left chapel to Saint Joseph, and the right chapel to Saint Livier.

The following picture presents the ground plan of Saint-Stephen of Metz and the position of the architectural elements:

Painting and sculpture 

The chapels of the transept were decorated in the 14th century with murals on the columns, which served as epitaphs for prominent church figures.   These were covered over with plaster in the remodelling of the 17th century and rediscovered and restored between 1840 and 1909. One good example is the painted epitaph of Jacques Poulain, from 1379, located on the north side at the sixth pillar.

Stained glass
The stained glass windows of the cathedral range in date from the 13th century to the 20th century, and cover an area of 6500 square meters; the cathedral has the most stained glass of any medieval religious monument.

The early windows resemble mosaics, made of very small pieces of thick, deeply-colored glass bound together by thin strips of lead.  The later windows became much larger and thinner, as glassmaking technology improved, with support of iron bars and stone tracery.  They were often colored with silver stain, and enamel paints which could be etched to give different shades and three dimensions, more closely resembling Renaissance paintings. The later Gothic periods also made greater use of grisaille, glass colored white, grey or other pale colors, to bring more light into the interior, and to highlight the colored glass.
Most of the original glass was removed in the centuries after the Middle Ages. Most of the glass today is restored or a more modern replacement.

The windows of Metz were made by the master craftsmen including Hermann von Münster in the fourteenth century, and Valentin Bousch in the sixteenth. In the twentieth century, the artist Marc Chagall created three stained glass windows for the cathedral between 1958 and 1968. Roger Bissière and Jacques Villon provided designs for further windows, including the complete chapel of the Holy Sacrament.

Early glass (13th century)

The earliest glass in the cathedral, from the third quarter of the 13th century, is found in the central bay of the Chapel of Notre-Dame-La-Rond, on the north side of the cathedral near the portal of that name. The glass was originally all in one window, but was separated and now is displayed in two parts in the lower portions of the bays. In the north (Bay 33) are the lancet windows which illustrate the genealogy of Christ and the Virgin Mary, as well as the prophets and apostles. In the South (Bay 28) is the oculus of the original window, with the crowning of the Virgin. This window very unusually depicts the Virgin to the left of Christ, who is presenting the crown to her with his left hand. A similar arrangement from the same period is found in Strasbourg Cathedral.

14th–15th century glass 

A number of important windows were installed in the 14th century, including the great rose window of the western facade. This window was the work of Hermann von Munster, who created an ambitious program of windows.  Other windows he designed were placed in the north and south arms of the transept, the west bay and the north and south arms of the transept.

16th century glass 

The most prominent examples of 16th-century glass are the windows of the north face of the transept, made by Valentin Bousch between 1521 and 1536.  Their figures clearly show the influence of the Renaissance, with a full use of perspective, shading, giving the windows a close resemblance to Renaissance paintings.

20th century – modern windows 

Between 1954 and 1958 most of the upper windows of the nave were replaced with windows designed to harmonize with the early Gothic windows by Jean Gaudin, who had restored the windows of Amiens Cathedral. Then, in 1956, Robert Renaud, chief architect of the Center of National Monuments, commissioned a group of windows for the Chapel of the Holy Sacrament designed by the cubist-impressionist Jacques Villon, the brother of pioneer modernist Marcel Duchamp, then eighty years old. The windows are composed of intersecting lines and planes of different colors, represents the Last Supper and Crucifixion, surrounded by abstract images of earlier Biblical symbols;  the rock of Mount Horeb, the Marriage at Cana, the Book of Exodus and a lamb representing Easter. They were installed in 1957.

Two other abstract windows were made by Roger Bissière for the portal of La Mutte and the portal of the Tower of the Chapter.  The former, facing the rising sun, has warm abstract colors, while the latter window, facing the sunset, has cool colors.

The best-known windows are those designed by Marc Chagall. They were commissioned at the same time that he was chosen by André Malraux, French Minister of Culture, to decorate the central dome of the Paris Opera. The first, in Bay 17 of the west of the north transept, made between 1958 and 1961, depicts Genesis and the creation, the original sin, and the expulsion from Eden. Two additional groups were made for two bays in the north disambulatory (bays 11 and 9). They were made between 1961 and 1967, and depict Old Testament scenes, including Moses receiving the Ten Commandments, the Sacrifice of Abraham, the Burning Bush, and other events.  The final series done by Chagall was created between 1968 and 1970 in the west triforium. These windows are "Grand Bouquet", a composition of birds and flowers and a rainbow on a background of nacre (Bays 111 and 113) and "Petit Bouquet"  (Bays 107–109).

Organs 

Metz Cathedral has two organs. The modern and larger organ is located in the transept. The smaller and older instrument, called the "Renaissance", is perched on the triforium of the last traverse of the nave, closest to the choir. It was placed there above the former rood screen to accompany ceremonies of the clergy taking place within the choir. It was made in 1537, and while the instrument has been regularly modified and updated, the wooden buffet or cabinet is original.

Crypt 

The original romanesque crypt beneath the choir was enlarged at the beginning of the 16th century to serve as a foundation for the new chevet. and contains ambulatory leading to three chapels. It was originally largely filled with tombs, It now serves as a museum of cathedral history.

The crypt displays the Graouilly, a large figure of the mythical dragon which was said in legend to been slain by Saint Clement in about 1000 AD. It was carried in religious processions in Metz beginning the 13th century and was described by Rabelais after his stay in Metz in 1546–47.  The body of the current Graouilly is made of canvas covering a metal frame is from the 19th century, while the head is wood from an 18th-century effigy of the creature.

Treasury 

The treasury of the cathedral, located in the old sacristy next to the south transept, lost most of its precious objects during the French Revolution, when they were taken away to be melted down for their gold or stripped of their jewels. The most famous item in the Treasury is the reputed "Cape of Charlemagne", a garment probably made in the 12th century. It is made of purple silk with three large eagles embroidered with gold, whose wings are decorated with roses and griffons. It was further adorned during the Renaissance with a plus a hood embroidered with silver.  The treasury also displays a large Bishop's ring made of stone and gold, called the Ring of Saint Arnoul, made in the 7th century.  It is one of the oldest Bishop's rings still existing.

See also

Gothic cathedrals and churches
French Gothic architecture
List of highest church naves
List of tallest churches
List of Gothic Cathedrals in Europe

References

Bibliography

External links
 Photos 
 

Buildings and structures in Metz
Roman Catholic churches in Metz
Metz
Architecture in Metz
Romanesque architecture in France
Gothic architecture in France
Roman Catholic churches completed in the 1520s
Burial sites of the Pippinids
16th-century Roman Catholic church buildings in France
Monuments historiques of Grand Est